The Siquijor Provincial Science High School is a Secondary Public Science High School system located in Siquijor, Philippines. It is a DepEd-recognized science high school.

Science high schools in the Philippines
Schools in Siquijor